Ana Paula Rodrigues Connelly Henkel (born 13 February 1972 in Lavras, Minas Gerais) is a retired female volleyball player and journalist from Brazil, who represented her native country at four Summer Olympics: in volleyball in 1992 and 1996, and  in beach volleyball in 2004 and 2008. With Brazil women's national volleyball team, she won three World Grand Prix editions and got medals in various tournaments, including the 1996 Olympics in the United States and the  1994 FIVB Volleyball Women's World Championship in Japan. On the beach, she won the FIVB Beach Volleyball World Tour in 2003 (alongside Sandra Pires) and 2008 (with Shelda Bede).

After retiring from volleyball in 2010, she moved to Los Angeles, California, where she majored in architecture at UCLA and is now studying to get a master's degree in political science. Noted for her conservative views, she had a column in newspaper O Estado de S. Paulo and joined news station Jovem Pan.

Personal life
She has been married three times, first to basketballer Jeffty Connelly from 1994 to 1998, and then to volleyball coach Marcus Miranda, with whom she had a son. Since 2010, she has been married to attorney and retired beach volleyballer Carl Henkel. She was considering a fifth Olympic appearance in 2012, but retired as she was developing panic disorder and started resenting being too absent for her son.

References

 UOL profile

External links
 
 
 
 
 
 Ana Paula Henkel's political column

1972 births
Living people
Brazilian people of German descent
Brazilian women's volleyball players
Brazilian women's beach volleyball players
Olympic volleyball players of Brazil
Olympic beach volleyball players of Brazil
Olympic bronze medalists for Brazil
Olympic medalists in volleyball
Volleyball players at the 1992 Summer Olympics
Volleyball players at the 1996 Summer Olympics
Beach volleyball players at the 2004 Summer Olympics
Beach volleyball players at the 2008 Summer Olympics
Medalists at the 1996 Summer Olympics
Brazilian expatriates in the United States
Brazilian anti-communists
People from Lavras
University of California, Los Angeles alumni
Sportspeople from Minas Gerais